Thomas R. Hills (born February 10, 1939) is an American former politician. He has served as a Republican member for the 31st district in the South Dakota House of Representatives from 2005 to 2008.

References

1939 births
Living people
People from Lyman County, South Dakota
Black Hills State University alumni
University of Oregon alumni
Educators from South Dakota
Republican Party members of the South Dakota House of Representatives
People from Spearfish, South Dakota